Yuna Nakagai (born 17 September 1999) is a Japanese professional footballer who plays as a forward for WE League club AC Nagano Parceiro Ladies.

Club career 
Nakagai made her WE League debut on 2 October 2021.

References 

Living people
1999 births
Women's association football forwards
WE League players
Japanese women's footballers
Association football people from Aichi Prefecture
AC Nagano Parceiro Ladies players